Ab Barik-e Sofla (also Romanized as Āb Bārīk-e Soflá; also known as Āb Bārīk and Āb-i-Bārīk) is a village in Firuzabad Rural District, Firuzabad District, Selseleh County, Lorestan Province, Iran. At the 2006 census, its population was 116, in 23 families.

References 

Towns and villages in Selseleh County